Chikwawa is a district in the Southern Region of Malawi. The capital is Chikwawa. The district covers an area of 4,755 km² and has a population of 356,682.

The district lies in a malaria endemic area in Africa and has recently been the target of efforts by a local Rotary Club to cover the entire district with insecticide-treated bednets.

Demographics
At the time of the 2018 Census of Malawi, the distribution of the population of Chikwawa District by ethnic group was as follows:
 48.6% Sena
 30.6% Mang'anja
 7.4% Chewa
 7.3% Lomwe
 1.4% Ngoni
 1.1% Yao
 0.4% Tumbuka
 0.3% Tonga
 0.1% Nyanja
 0.1% Nkhonde
 0.0% Sukwa
 0.0% Lambya
 2.6% Others

Government and administrative divisions

There are seven National Assembly constituencies in Chikwawa:

 Chikwawa - East
 Chikwawa - Central
 Chikwawa - Nkombezi
 Chikwawa - North
 Chikwawa - South
 Chikwawa - West 
 Chikwawa - Central West

Central West is new and comprises the wards Nchalo and Lengwe.

Since the 2009 general election all of these constituencies have been represented by politicians from the Democratic Progressive Party.

References

Districts of Malawi
Districts in Southern Region, Malawi